Andrei Dmitriyevich Bokovoy (born 4 March 2000) is a Russian football player. He plays for FC Tver.

Club career
He made his debut in the Russian Premier League for PFC Sochi on 19 June 2020 in a game against FC Rostov, replacing Aleksandr Kokorin in the 69th minute. FC Rostov was forced to field their Under-18 squad in that game as their main squad was quarantined after 6 players tested positive for COVID-19.

On 25 February 2021, he moved to FNL side FC Veles Moscow.

References

External links
 
 
 

2000 births
Footballers from Saint Petersburg
Living people
Russian footballers
Association football midfielders
PFC Sochi players
FC Veles Moscow players
FC Zvezda Perm players
Russian Premier League players
Russian First League players
Russian Second League players